Rick Leach and Danie Visser were the defending champions, but did not partner together this year.  Leach partnered Jared Palmer, losing in the semifinals.  Visser partnered Patrick Galbraith, losing in the final.

Luke Jensen and Murphy Jensen won the title, defeating Galbraith and Visser 6–3, 5–7, 6–4 in the final.

Seeds

  Jan Apell /  Jonas Björkman (quarterfinals)
  Rick Leach /  Jared Palmer (semifinals)
  Luke Jensen /  Murphy Jensen (champions)
  Patrick Galbraith /  Danie Visser (final)

Draw

Draw

External links
 Draw

Nottingham Open
1995 ATP Tour
1995 Nottingham Open